Powelliphanta hochstetteri, known as one of the amber snails, is a species of large, carnivorous land snail, a terrestrial pulmonate gastropod mollusc in the family Rhytididae.

Distribution
This species is endemic to the Marlborough and Nelson provinces of the South Island of New Zealand.
There are five subspecies:
 Powelliphanta hochstetteri anatokiensis Powell, 1938
 Powelliphanta hochstetteri bicolor Powell, 1930
 Powelliphanta hochstetteri consobrina Powell, 1936
 Powelliphanta hochstetteri hochstetteri (Pfeiffer, 1862)
 Powelliphanta hochstetteri obscura Beutler, 1901

Description 

Powelliphanta hochstetteri was originally described under the name Helix hochstetteri  by German malacologist Ludwig Karl Georg Pfeiffer in 1862. He described it according to the shell only, which geologist German Ferdinand von Hochstetter had brought from the New Zealand. The specific name hochstetteri is in honor of Ferdinand von Hochstetter.

Life cycle 
The shape of the eggs is oval and they are seldom constant in dimensions: 12 × 10 mm.

References

Powelliphanta
Gastropods described in 1862
Endemic molluscs of New Zealand
Endemic fauna of New Zealand